Independence Junior College was established in 2007 to offer tertiary-level education opportunities in Independence Village, Stann Creek District, Belize.

References

Universities in Belize